The East Side Fire Station, at Douglas and Hopkins Sts. in Defiance, Ohio, was built in 1889.  It was listed on the National Register of Historic Places in 1976.

It has also been known as Fourth Ward Building and served as a ward voting place.  It also served as a police station.  It was later a city maintenance building.

References

Fire stations on the National Register of Historic Places in Ohio
National Register of Historic Places in Defiance County, Ohio
Fire stations completed in 1889
Defiance, Ohio
Government buildings on the National Register of Historic Places in Ohio